Krogia is a genus of corticolous lichens in the family Ramalinaceae. It occurs in tropical humid forests and rainforests. The genus was circumscribed by Norwegian lichenologist Einar Timdal in 2002, with Krogia coralloides assigned as the type species.

The genus name of Krogia is in honour of Hildur Krog (1922–2014), who was a Norwegian botanist.

Species
Krogia antillarum  – West Indies
Krogia borneensis  – Borneo
Krogia coralloides  – Mauritius
Krogia isidiata  – New Caledonia
Krogia macrophylla  – New Caledonia
Krogia microphylla  – Dominican Republic

References

Ramalinaceae
Lecanorales genera
Lichen genera
Taxa described in 2002
Taxa named by Einar Timdal